In molecular biology, entericidins are bacterial antidote/toxin peptides. The entericidin locus is activated in the stationary phase of growth under high osmolarity conditions by rho-S and simultaneously repressed by the osmoregulatory EnvZ/OmpR signal transduction pathway. The entericidin locus encodes tandem paralogous genes (ecnAB) and directs the synthesis of two small cell-envelope lipoproteins (entericidin A and entericidin B) which can maintain plasmids in bacterial population by means of post-segregational killing.

References

Protein families